Doremus Tremayne Bennerman (born July 5, 1972) is an American former professional basketball player.

College
Bennerman played at Siena between 1990 and 1994. He is one of only two players in program history to score over 2,000 points (2,109). In the 1993–94 season, Doremus led the Saints to the semifinals of the National Invitational Tournament (NIT). In the third place game against Kansas State, Bennerman scored a school-record 51 points and made 27 of 30 free throw attempts. He scored 174 points in 5 NIT games and was selected as the tournament MVP. Bennerman's 174 points in the NIT remain a tournament record.

Professional career

Doremus Bennerman started his professional career in Östersund and Jämtland Basket in 1995. He remained in Jämtland Basket until 1998 when he left for clubs in Finland and Spain. In 1999, he returned to Sweden and played for Sundsvall Dragons during three consecutive seasons. Between 2002 and 2007, he played for several clubs in Europe among other in Greece and Italy. For the 2007 campaign, Bennerman returned to Östersund and Jämtland Basket. Before the 2020/2021 season, Bennerman was appointed assistant coach at Jämtland Basket.

Awards and honors
 Basketligan Most Valuable Player 1996
 Basketligan Guard of the Year 1997
 Basketligan Artist of the Year 2000, 2002

References

External links 
Doremus Bennerman College Career

1972 births
Living people
American expatriate basketball people in Finland
American expatriate basketball people in Italy
American expatriate basketball people in Spain
American expatriate basketball people in Sweden
American men's basketball players
Apollon Patras B.C. players
Basketball players from Connecticut
Jämtland Basket players
Olimpia Milano players
Olympia Larissa B.C. players
Pallacanestro Cantù players
Pallacanestro Virtus Roma players
Point guards
Siena Saints men's basketball players
Sportspeople from Bridgeport, Connecticut
Sundsvall Dragons players
Teramo Basket players
Virtus Bologna players